is a Japanese manga series written and illustrated by Koge-Donbo. The manga is in serialisation in Broccoli Books's magazine, Comi Digi +. In North America, the manga was released by Broccoli Books USA. It is about a boy named Ren who just wants to be one of the cool kids, but he secretly is a nerdy monster fanatic. That is, until a young girl named Kokon shows up. She claims to be a fox that he had helped years ago, and now she wants to return the favor.

Plot 
The series starts with Ren in school, getting high grades, and wishing Himeka would notice him. However,  this is all interrupted when Kokon comes in and jumps on Ren, saying that she "has come to repay him". At first, Ren is indifferent towards Konkon, but that quickly changes when after Himeka asks Ren to explore the school with her because she had heard about an obake while exploring he discovers that Konkon is actually a Kyubi-no-Kitsune, a nine-tailed fox, something he hides from Himeka.

Later, Kitsuneko, another fox demon from the same clan as Kokon, makes a similar appearance as Kokon first did. She demands that Ren let Kokon go with her. Ren refuses, and Kitsuneko challenges Ren to a contest for Kokon to stay or not, which Ren wins when Kokon saves him. During the contest, Ren finds out that Kokon is a god of the fox clan called a "Miko" which is chosen by one of the other fox yokai. Kitsuneko also develops a crush on Ren and ends up staying with Konkon and Ren.

During a swimming contest, Kitsuneko gets jealous at seeing Himeka together with Ren and shoots at Himeka. She ends up hitting an umibōzu instead. Kokon then sees that it is an Ocean Miko. She also realizes that it is sad, something that Ren fixes by pulling its power source out of black goop. The umibōzu, who looks a bit like Himeka, later pays a visit to Ren at his house while saying that she needs to pay him back for his kindness, something that does not go well with Kokon. From Umibozu's payback promise to Kitsuneko's flirting with Ren, she becomes sad and determined to get Ren's attention back. She does that by accident by blowing up food in the kitchen and getting herself covered in it. Ren, pleased that Kokon is acting more like a yokai than a foxgirl, is happy, but Kokon is not, saying she "became human in order to be his wife".

Characters 

 - Ren is a country bumpkin who recreates himself as a smart and cool guy in Tokyo so as not to reveal his secret, which is that he is a Japanese demon otaku.

-  Kokon is a fox-demon girl who comes to Tokyo to repay her debt to Ren, a boy who saved her life. At the ending of the first volume, she claims that she became human in order to be his wife.

 - Kitsuneko is a fox-demon girl from the same fox-demon clan as Kokon. She appears to take Kokon back to her clan and challenges Ren to a race to find a charm. But after meeting Ren, she gains a new agenda: staying as close to Ren as possible.

 - Himeka is Ren's classmate and Kazune's cousin. Because she is Ren's crush, he is always trying to act cool in front of her. She is also a main character in Koge-Donbo's Kamichama Karin and a minor character in Koge-Donbo's Kamichama Karin Chu.

 - Kazune is Ren's classmate who is smart, good-looking, popular with girls, and cool. He is also a main character in Koge-Donbo's Kamichama Karin/Kamichama Karin Chu series.

 - Umibozu is an ocean-dwelling demon. During a trip to the beach, Ren helps her, and she soon chases after him with a desire to repay him for what he did. It is later discovered that Umibozu is actually male.

Manga 
So far, there has been only one volume released in both Japan and North America. Japan's manga release date was December 21, 2006.  In North America, Broccoli Books USA released an English version on June 13, 2007. Broccoli Books USA went under in December 2008 so the future of the manga is uncertain. The book licenses that Broccoli International USA had reverted to Japanese publishers at the end of 2008. However, Broccoli stated that they were "working with them so the titles can be released by other US publishers sometime in the future".

Reception
Mania.com's Ariadne Roberts commends the manga for its "delicately textured and soft to the touch" cover as well as its "reprinted with exquisite clarity" "black & white pages".

References

External links 
 KonKon on Koge Donbo's Page (In Japanese)
 

Seinen manga
2006 manga
Romantic comedy anime and manga
Action anime and manga
Science fiction anime and manga
Japanese mythology in anime and manga
Comi Digi + manga